9 Regiment RLC is a regiment of the British Army's Royal Logistic Corps.

History
The regiment was formed on 5 April 1993 and has participated in several conflicts and operations in Northern Ireland, Iraq and Afghanistan.

Structure
It is partnered with 156 Regiment RLC in the UK. The Regiment is made up of four squadrons:
 90 Headquarter Squadron
 66 Fuel and General Transport Squadron
 84 Medical Supply Squadron
 94 Supply Squadron (Queens Own Gurkha Logistic Regiment)

The regiment is paired with 152 (North Irish) Regiment RLC and 167 Catering Support Regiment RLC for training and mobilisation.

References

External links

Regiments of the Royal Logistic Corps